Thomas Heberer (born September 24, 1965, in Schleswig, Germany) is a trumpeter, quarter-tone trumpeter, cornetist, keyboardist and composer, primarily focused on jazz, creative improvised music and contemporary chamber music. Based in New York City, he currently works as a leader and sideman in a variety of bands in Europe and the US.

Education 
Heberer began playing trumpet at the age of 11. From 1984 to 1987, he studied at conservatory with Manfred Schoof at the Cologne University of Music.

Notable projects: 1987 to present

Leader 
Heberer leads several projects, including past and present: 
 Lip Lab, a trio with Carl Ludwig Hübsch on tuba and Christian Thomé on drums. The group released Lex Luna on JazzHausMusik in 2007.
 Clarino, a trio with clarinetist Joachim Badenhorst and bassist Pascal Niggenkemper, released two albums: Klippe in 2011 (Clean Feed) and 2012's Cookbook (Red Toucan).
 X Marks the Spot, a quartet with guitarist Terrence McManus, bassist Michael Bates, and drummer Jeff Davis, debuted with an eponymous album in 2019 on OutNow Recordings.
 A quartet, featuring saxophonist Ingrid Laubrock, bassist John Hébert, and drummer Michael Sarin. Their debut album The Day That Is will be released on Sunnyside Records on October 22, 2021.

Solo work 
He has recorded and performed solo. Notable recordings include: The Heroic Millipede in 1988 (ITM); "Kill Yr Darlins" in 1997 (Poise); two albums on the Poise label under the pseudonym T.O.M.: Stella in 2001 and Mouth  in 2003; the digitally released Sloops in 2007; and a vinyl-only release called One on NoBusiness Records in 2011.

His solo work has been used for films and dance performances, including for two choreographies by Pina Bausch. Choreographer Bausch's Für die Kinder von gestern, heute and morgen  (2002) uses a track from "Stella" called German Measles; Bausch's Ten Chi  (2004), uses a track called Blue" from the album Mouth.Wim Wenders used "Blue" in Pina, which was nominated for an Academy Award in 2011 for Best Documentary Feature.

"Blue" and "German Measles" were both used in Pina Bausch, a documentary directed by Anne Linsel (WDR/Arte) in 2006 and re-released by the Goethe-Institut in 2012 (IN2998).

 ICP and other ensembles 
He has been a member of the Instant Composers Pool (ICP) Orchestra from 1993 to present. Founded by Misha Mengelberg, Han Bennink and Willem Breuker, ICP currently comprises Han Bennink, Michael Moore, Ab Baars, Tobias Delius, Wolter Wierbos, Guus Janssen, Mary Oliver, Tristan Honsinger, and Ernst Glerum.

During Heberer's involvement, the band has recorded numerous albums for hatOLOGY and ICP, and performed extensively around the world, including tours in Argentina, Australia, Brazil, Canada, China, Colombia, Europe, Japan and the US. Notable US performances with ICP include the Library of Congress, Harvard University, and the Great American Music Hall in San Francisco.

From 1987 to 2000, Heberer was a member of Alexander von Schlippenbach's Berlin Contemporary Jazz Orchestra, which at the time included Evan Parker, Kenny Wheeler, Aki Takase, Paul Lovens and others. During his involvement, the Orchestra recorded three albums for ECM, FMP and DIW, and performed in Europe and Japan.

Heberer was a member of Tome XX with saxophonist Dirk Raulf, bassist Tim Wells (1987-1989), bassist, Dieter Manderscheid (1990-1996), and drummer Fritz Wittek. From 1987 to 1996, the band recorded four albums under the JazzHausMusik label, touring across Europe, Africa and South America.

From 1988 to 1996, Heberer was a member of the European Jazz Ensemble, along with Joachim Kühn, Gerd Dudek, Konrad Bauer, Charlie Mariano, Tony Levin and others. In addition to performing across Europe, he is included on two recordings from the time: "Meets the Khan Family" (MA Music) and "20th Anniversary Tour" (Konnex).

Heberer received significant attention in 1990 with his release of the album Chicago Breakdown: The Music of Jelly Roll Morton, recorded with bassist Dieter Manderscheid. The Penguin Guide to Jazz gave Chicago Breakdown four stars, the publication's highest rating, citing it "highly recommended." Heberer and Manderscheid went on to record two more duo albums: What a Wonderful World (2002), in recognition for the centenary of Louis Armstrong, and Wanderlust (2007), a reflection on American blues music. What a Wonderful World was critically acclaimed and received four out of five stars in Down Beat.  As a duo, Heberer and Manderscheid have performed across Europe, Asia and the US.

From 2008 to 2013, Heberer joined drummer Joe Hertenstein's band HNH with bassist Pascal Niggenkemper. The band released two records on Clean Feed: HNH (black album) and HNH (white album). With the addition of clarinetist Joachim Badenhorst, the band made an album called Polylemma on Red Toucan records, released in 2011. That year, Polylemma won the Happy New Ears award from the Free Jazz Collective.

In 2013, Heberer and longtime collaborator Achim Kaufmann released their first recording on Red Toucan called Knoten, followed by a second recording with Ken Filiano joining Kaufmann and Heberer, called Interstices on NuScope Recordings in 2015.

In 2014, Heberer replaced the late Roy Campbell in the Nu Band, which comprises Mark Whitecage, Joe Fonda, and Lou Grassi; they toured Europe in 2014, 2016, 2017 and 2019. Two recordings were issued on Not Two Records: The Cosmological Constant (2015) and Live in Geneva (2017). Upon the passing of Mark Whitecage in 2021, the group was joined by Ken Wessel.  

In 2018, Heberer collaborated with tenor saxophonist Yoni Kretzmer and bassist Christian Weber. The trio recorded BIG in 2018, which was released on OutNow Recordings.

In 2020, Heberer collaborated with bassist Joe Fonda and drummer Joe Hertenstein on an album called Remedy, released in 2021 on the Fundacja Słuchaj! label.

 Sideman 
He participates as a sideman in numerous ensembles and recordings with leaders such as Muhal Richard Abrams, Peter Brötzmann, Han Bennink, Eugene Chadbourne, Dave Douglas, Joe Fonda, Frank Gratkowski, Barry Guy, Christoph Haberer, Gabriele Hasler, Joe Hertenstein, Guus Janssen, Maria João, Paul van Kemenade], Yoni Kretzmer, Misha Mengelberg, Butch Morris, Bob Moses, Alphonse Mouzon, David Murray, Sunny Murray, Michael Riessler, Alexander von Schlippenbach, Andreas Schmidt, Frank Schulte, Elliott Sharp, Norbert Stein, Steve Swell, Aki Takase, Attila Zoller, John Zorn.

 Harald Schmidt 
He served as a member of the regular band supporting German talk show host and entertainer Harald Schmidt from 1995 to 2007. He was also featured as a guest several times including for the Miles Davis episode on November 22, 2002.

From 1995 to 2003 the show aired four times a week for the German SAT1 private television channel. From 2005 to 2007, the show was performed 2 times per week for ARD, Germany's national television channel.

 Critical reception Die Zeit critic Konrad Heidkamp called him "the master of German trumpet," The Penguin Guide to Jazz said "outstandingly gifted," the Rowohlt Jazz Lexikon credits him with having "developed a unique trumpet style," and colleague Alexander von Schlippenbach named him "our new trumpet genius."

 Teaching 
From 1993 to 1997, Heberer lectured at the music conservatory Hochschule für Musik und Darstellende Kunst in Frankfurt-Main, Germany.

He has conducted numerous workshops with the ICP Orchestra (among others, the 2007 Banff International Workshop in Jazz and Creative Music in Alberta, Canada) as well as for the Goethe-Institut in South America, Asia and Africa.

He compiled a summary on trumpet techniques called Trumpet Mechanics.

Other teaching positions include the jazz workshop at Akademie Remscheid in Germany and the Maine Jazz Camp at the University of Maine in Farmington. 

 Concepts 
In addition to using regular staff paper for his compositions, Heberer has developed a notation code that he calls "Cookbook." It is an instant composition method, which allows for a high amount of freedom on the musicians' side while allowing significant structural tools on the composer's side as well. It does so by implementing the idea of instant memory shaped according to a specific set of rules.

 Awards and recognition 
 SWR-Jazzpreis, 1990
 Preis der Deutschen Schallplattenkritik, Vierteljahresliste, 1990, for "Chicago Breakdown: The Music of Jelly Roll Morton" with Dieter Manderscheid
 Jazz-Art Preis in 2002, for "What a Wonderful World" with Dieter Manderscheid
 Winner of DownBeat Critics TDWR Poll Award in 2002, for Instant Composers Pool (ICP) Orchestra
 Preis der Deutschen Schallplattenkritik, Jahrespreis 2004, for the Aki Takase Band "Plays Fats Waller"
 Finalist in DownBeat'' 58th Annual Critics Poll 2010, for Instant Composers Pool (ICP) Orchestra
 Winner of the Happy New Ears award 2011 for "Polylemma," an album by the Joe Hertenstein Quartet on Red Toucan

Select discography

Select filmography

References

External links 
 Official site: www.thomasheberer.com
 ICP music video Steigerpijp
 Anne Linsel's Portrait of Pina Bausch, featuring Thomas Heberer's music
 Performance photos of Thomas Heberer by Peter Gannushkin
 

German trumpeters
Male trumpeters
German composers
1965 births
Living people
People from Schleswig, Schleswig-Holstein
21st-century trumpeters
21st-century German male musicians
Berlin Contemporary Jazz Orchestra members
Clean Feed Records artists
Sunnyside Records artists
NoBusiness Records artists
ICP Orchestra members